Ogorzelczyn  is a village in the administrative district of Gmina Tuliszków, within Turek County, Greater Poland Voivodeship, in west-central Poland.

The village has a population of 560.

References

Ogorzelczyn